Young and Dangerous: The Prequel is a 1998 Hong Kong crime film directed by Andrew Lau. It is the second prequel in the Young and Dangerous film series.

The film shows Chan Ho-nam (Nicholas Tse), Big Head (Daniel Wu), Chow Pan (Benjamin Yuen), Chicken Chiu (Sam Lee), and their friends being recruited by Uncle Bee (Ng Chi-Hung) and joining the "Hung Hing" triad.

Cast
Nicholas Tse as Chan Ho-nam
Daniel Wu as Big Head
Francis Ng as Ugly Kwan
Shu Qi as Fei
Sam Lee as Chicken
Sandra Ng as Sister 13 (cameo)
Kristy Yang as Yung (cameo)
Benjamin Yuen as Chow Pan

Notes

Because he was only 17, and born on 29 August 1980, Nicholas Tse is not allowed to watch the movie when the movie opens in Hong Kong cinemas on 5 June 1998 because this movie is classified as Category III, which is a restricted category in the Hong Kong motion picture rating system and the category is strictly for persons aged 18 and above only.

It is worth noting that the story retcons the flashback from the first film, taking place in 1988 rather than 1985.

Awards and nominations
18th Hong Kong Film Awards
 Won: Best New Performer (Nicholas Tse)

External links 
 

Films directed by Andrew Lau
1998 films
1998 crime drama films
1990s action films
Hong Kong action films
Hong Kong crime films
1990s Cantonese-language films
Triad films
Golden Harvest films
Young and Dangerous
1990s Hong Kong films